Andy Lewis is an English record producer, musician and bassist. He has released two albums as a solo artist, on Acid Jazz Records: Billion Pound Project in September 2005 and You Should Be Hearing Something Now! in October 2007. He is a member of the bands Pimlico, The Red Inspectors, and Spearmint.

In recent years, Lewis has appeared on bass guitar and backing vocals in Paul Weller's live band, as well as on Weller's albums 22 Dreams, Wake Up the Nation and Sonik Kicks, contributing bass, and also cello to "Light Nights", the opening track on 22 Dreams. In 2007, Lewis and Weller released a single as a duo: "Are You Trying to Be Lonely?". He was briefly interviewed on the Just a Dream live DVD, also appearing in the rehearsal session and live BBC footage.

Album discography
Billion Pound Project, Acid Jazz, 2005
You Should Be Hearing Something Now!, Acid Jazz, 2007
41, Acid Jazz, 2011 [mini LP]
Songs For A South Herts Symphony, MP3, 2014
Bassetlaw, MP3, 2014
Get Ready!, MP3, 2014 [as Lewis, Doyle & Twyman]
Summer Dancing, Acid Jazz, 2017 [with Judy Dyble]

References

External links
Andy Lewis bandcamp
Andy Lewis website [last updated 2010)

English bass guitarists
English record producers
Living people
Alumni of the University of Wales, Lampeter
Acid Jazz Records artists
Year of birth missing (living people)